This page lists the military units which are known to be capable of performing a HAHO/HALO jump, also known as Military Free Fall (MFF).

Albania
 Special Operations Battalion
 Commando Battalion

Algeria 

 Algerian special forces
 104th Operational Maneuvers Regiment (104th RMO)
 116th Operational Maneuvers Regiment (116th RMO)

Argentina
 Grupo Especial de Operaciones Federales (Federal Operations Special Group, GEOF)
Buzos Tacticos (Tactical Divers Group)
Agrupacion de Comando Anfibios (Amphibious Commandos Group)
GOE (Special Operations Group)

Armenia
Army special forces regiment

Australia
 Army
Australian Defence Force Parachuting School
 Australian Army Parachute Display Team (The Red Berets)
Special Operations Command
Special Air Service Regiment
2nd Commando Regiment

Austria
 Jagdkommando
 EKO Cobra
 Jägerbattalion 25

Bangladesh

Army
Para-Commando Brigade
Navy
SWADS

Belgium
 Special Operations Regiment

Brazil

Navy/Marines
 GRUMEC Brazilian Navy Combat Divers 
 COMANF Brazilian Navy Marine Commandos
 GERR Brazilian Navy/Marines Especial Groups of Retake and Rescue
Army
 COMANDOS Army Commandos
 1º Batalhão de Forcas Especiais Army Special Forces Unit
 PRECURSORES PARAQUEDISTAS Army Paras Pathfinders
Air Force
 Para-SAR Commandos of PARA SAR Air Force Infantryman

Canada
 Canadian Special Operations Regiment
 Combat Patrol Pathfinders
 Joint Task Force 2

Chile
 Chilean Army - Chilean Commandos

China
People's Liberation Army Air Force
People's Liberation Army Air Force Airborne Corps
People's Liberation Army Navy
 People's Liberation Army Navy Marine Corps
 Jiaolong Commando Unit
 Reconnaissance Battalion, 2nd Marine Brigade
People's Liberation Army Ground Force
 73rd Special Operation Brigade - "Feilong"
 75th Special Operation Brigade - "Jungle Tigers"
 76th Special Operation Brigade - "Xuefeng"
 78th Special Operation Brigade - "Northeastern Tiger"
 84th Special Operation Brigade - "Kunlun Blade"
People's Armed Police
 Snow Leopard Commando Unit

Croatia
 General Staff of the Armed Forces of the Republic of Croatia Special Operations Battalion
 Croatian Ministry of the Interior Lučko Anti-Terrorist Unit

Czech Republic
 601st Special Forces Group

Denmark
 Jægerkorpset Hunter Corps

France

 11e Brigade Parachutiste:
Groupement des Commandos Parachutistes (Pathfinders)
 Commandement des Opérations Spéciales:
 1er Régiment de Parachutistes d'Infanterie de Marine
 13e Régiment de Dragons Parachutistes
 Commandos Marine
 Commando Parachutiste de l'Air n°10 (French Air Force Special Forces)
 Direction Générale de la Sécurité Extérieure:
 Division Action
 Gendarmerie Nationale:
 Groupe d'Intervention de la Gendarmerie Nationale
 Escadron Parachutiste d'Intervention de la Gendarmerie Nationale
 Police Nationale
 Recherche Assistance Intervention Dissuasion

Finland
 Finnish Army Special Jaegers
 Finnish Army Para Jaegers

Georgia
 Army 
GSOF 
 State Security Service
Counter Terrorism Center special operations unit.

Germany
 German Army
 Kommando Spezialkräfte
 Fallschirmjäger
 Fernspähkompanie LRRP
 German Navy 
 Kampfschwimmer
 German Federal Police 
 GSG 9 Police Counter Terrorism Unit

Greece
 Army
ETA (Special Airborne Unit)
Z' MAK (Z' Amphibious Raider Squadron)
 Navy
DYK (Underwater Demolitions Command)
 Air Force
31 MEEΔ (31 Search & Rescue Operations Squadron)
 Police
EKAM (Special Suppressive Antiterrorist Unit)

India
Army
 Parachute Regiment (India)
 Para (Special Forces)
 Air Force
 Garud Commando Force
 Navy
 MARCOS
 Paramilitary Forces
 Special Frontier Force
 National Security Guards

Indonesia

 Indonesian Army
 Kopassus
 Kostrad airborne brigades 
 Indonesian Navy
 KOPASKA 
 Denjaka 
 Indonesian Marine Corps
 Batalyon Intai Amfibi 
 Indonesian Air Force
Paskhas
 Bravo-Den 90

Ireland
 Army Ranger Wing (ARW)

Israel
Sayeret Matkal
Shayetet 13
Shaldag
Maglan

Italy
 Army
 9th Paratroopers Assault Regiment "Col Moschin" (9º Reggimento d'Assalto Paracadutisti "Col Moschin") 
 Navy
 Operational Raiders Group - Divers and Riders Group Command "Teseo Tesei" (Gruppo Operativo Incursori - Comando Raggruppamento Subacquei e Incursori "Teseo Tesei")
 Air Force
 Operational Raiders Group - 17th Raiders Wing (Gruppo Operativo Incursori - 17º Stormo) 
 Gendarmerie
 Special Intervention Group (GIS - Gruppo di Intervento Speciale)
 Police
 Central Security Operational Unit (''NOCS - Nucleo Operativo Centrale di Sicurezza")

Japan
Japan Ground Self-Defense Force
 Special Forces Group
 Pathfinder Platoon of the 1st Airborne Brigade

Morocco

1st Parachute Infantry Brigade
Moroccan Special Forces SOTGH

Malaysia
 Malaysian Army 
 Grup Gerak Khas
 10 Paratrooper Brigade 
 Royal Malaysian Navy
 PASKAL 
 Royal Malaysian Air Force
 PASKAU 
 Royal Malaysian Police
 Pasukan Gerakan Khas 
 Malaysian Coast Guard
 Special Task and Rescue

Namibia
 Namibian Special Forces

Netherlands
 Dutch Korps Commandotroepen (KCT) Royal Netherlands Army Commandos
 Dutch Netherlands Maritime Special Operations Forces (NLMARSOF)
 Dutch 11th Airmobile Brigade (Netherlands) Pathfinder platoon "Madju"

New Zealand
 New Zealand Special Air Service

Norway
Hærens Jegerkommando HJK - Army Ranger Command
 Marinejegerkommandoen MJK - Navy Ranger Command
 Forsvarets spesialkommando FSK - Armed Forces Special Command

Pakistan

 Special Service Group
Parachute Regiment
  Pakistan Navy
Special Service Group Navy 
Pakistan Marines
 
Special Service Wing

Peru
 Fuerza de Operaciones Especiales (FOES) (Peruvian Navy)
 Defensa y Operaciones Especiales (DOE)  (Peruvian Air Force)

Philippines
Army:
 Special Forces Regiment (Airborne)
 Light Reaction Regiment
 1st Scout Ranger Regiment
Navy
 Naval Special Operations Command
Marine Corps:
 Marine Special Operations Group
Air Force:
 SPOW
 505th Search And Rescue Group

Poland
 GROM
 1 Pułk Specjalny Komandosów

Portugal
Special Actions Detachment
Pathfinders Company
Special Operations Troops Centre

Russia and the Soviet Union
 GRU Special Forces:
 Detachments in each of the special forces Brigades of the Ground Forces.
 45th Detached Reconnaissance Regiment of the VDV
 Reconnaissance Frogmen of the Russian Navy
 Command of Special Operations Forces
Special Purpose Center "Senezh"
Special Purpose Center "Kubinka-2"
561st Emergency Rescue Center
Special Aviation Brigade
Federal Security Service
Group "A"
Group "B" (V)
Group "C" (S)
Group "K"
Regional UFSB teams
Russian National Guard
 Special Purpose Center Teams: Rus and Vityaz
 SOBR Units
Federal Protective Service
SVR : Zaslon
Russian Airborne Forces

Serbia
 Special Brigade (Serbian army)

Singapore
 Special Operations Force

South Africa
 Special Forces Brigade
 7 Medical Battalion Group
 44 Parachute Regiment

South Korea
 Republic of Korea Army Special Warfare Command
707th Special Mission Group
 Republic of Korea Naval Special Warfare Flotilla
 Republic of Korea Air Force - Combat Control Team(CCT)
 Republic of Korea Air Force - Special Air Force Rescue Team(SART)
 Republic of Korea Marine Corps - Force Recon

Spain
Mando de Operaciones Especiales - (Spanish Army)
Fuerza de Guerra Naval Especial - (Spanish Marines)
Escuadron de Zapadores Paracaidistas - (Spanish Air Force)

Sweden
 Särskilda operationsgruppen (SOG)

Switzerland
 Fallschirmaufklärer Kompanie 17 (Swiss Army VBS)

Taiwan
 862nd Special Warfare Brigade
Airborne Special Service Company
101st Amphibious Reconnaissance Battalion

Thailand
 Special Force Division and LRRP (Royal Thai Army)
 Royal Thai Navy SEALs (Royal Thai Navy)
 Special Operation Force PJ/CCT (Royal Thai Air Force)

Turkey
 Special Forces Command 
 Underwater Offence   
 1st Commando Brigade

United Kingdom
 Special Air Service
 Special Boat Service
 Special Reconnaissance Regiment
 18 (UKSF) Signal Regiment
 SFSG
 Pathfinder Platoon
Royal Navy -  Fleet Diving Group 1
29 Commando RA - 148 Battery

United States

Air Force

 U.S. Air Force Pararescue
 U.S. Air Force Combat Control Team
 U.S. Air Force Tactical Air Control Party
 U.S. Air Force Special Reconnaissance 
 U.S. Air Force S.E.R.E. Specialists
 U.S. Air Force Physiological Technicians (PTs)

Army
 Parachute Riggers 
 Long Range Surveillance Companies
 U.S. Army 75th Ranger Regiment
 Regimental Reconnaissance Company
 U.S. Army Special Forces
 U.S. Army 1st Special Forces Operational Detachment-Delta (also known as Delta Force)
 U.S. Army Intelligence Support Activity (USAIS) (also known as Intelligence Support Activity)
 RAVENS (Raiding Aggressor Volunteers Employing Night Skydiving—the very first operating unit—Ft. Campbell, KY, Sept. 1959)
Airborne and Special Operations Test Directorate (ABNSOTD)

Marine Corps
 Parachute Riggers 
 U.S. Marine Corps Force Reconnaissance
 U.S. Marine Raider Regiment

Navy
 U.S. Navy SEALs
SEAL Team Six (Naval Special Warfare Development Group, also known as DEVGRU)
 U.S. Navy SWCC
 U.S. Navy EOD
 U.S. Navy direct support personnel (IT/ET/CT Rates/SOIDC)
 U.S. Navy SARC
 Parachute Riggers

References

Halo
HALO HAHO Jump
Parachuting
Airborne warfare